Gorodetsky is a rural locality (a settlement) in Kulundinsky District, Altai Krai, Russia. The population was 205 as of 2013. There are 2 streets.

Geography 
Gorodetsky is located 22 km north of Kulunda (the district's administrative centre) by road. Vozdvizhenka, Yambor and Kharkovka are the nearest rural localities.

References 

Rural localities in Kulundinsky District